Sir Andrew Marshall Porter, 1st Baronet PC, QC (27 June 1837 – 9 January 1919) was an Irish lawyer and judge.

Background and education
Porter was born in Belfast, the son of Reverend John Scott Porter and his wife Margaret Marshall. He was educated at the Royal Belfast Academical Institution, and Queen's University, Belfast.

Legal and judicial career
In 1860 Porter was called to the Bar and by 1872 had become Queen's Counsel. He sat as Member of Parliament for County Londonderry from 1881 to 1884 and served under William Ewart Gladstone as Solicitor-General for Ireland from 1881 to 1882 and as Attorney-General for Ireland from 1882 to 1883: he was deeply involved in the trials following the Phoenix Park murders. He was appointed Master of the Rolls in Ireland in 1883 and served in that post until 1907. It was announced that he would receive a baronetcy in the 1902 Coronation Honours list published on 26 June 1902 for the (subsequently postponed) coronation of King Edward VII, and on 24 July 1902, he was created a Baronet, of Merrion square, in the city and county of Dublin.

A. M. Sullivan described him as "a fine lawyer of noble presence and true dignity" who did not tolerate any disturbance to the decorum of his Court. As a judge, Sullivan ranked him as one of the four greatest he had ever known, and perhaps the equal of the celebrated Christopher Palles.

Family
Porter married Agnes Horsburgh and they had six children:

 Helen Violet Porter (d. 1961), unmarried
 Margaret Porter, married Capt. Cuthbert Avenal John Vernon
 Sir John Scott Horsburgh-Porter, 2nd Baronet (1871–1953), succeeded his father in the title
 Alexander Porter (1872–1946)
 Andrew Marshall Porter (1874–1900), a noted sportsman who was killed in the Second Boer War
 William Francis Porter (1878–1903)

While living in Dublin, Porter resided at 42 Merrion Square East, as noted in Ulysses by James Joyce.

Arms

References

 Plarr, Victor, Men and Women of the Time: A Dictionary of Contemporaries (London, 1899), p. 872.
 Gifford, Don, Ulysses Annotated: Notes for James Joyce's Ulysses (University of California Press, 1989), p. 182.

External links 

1837 births
1919 deaths
19th-century Irish lawyers
Attorneys-General for Ireland
Baronets in the Baronetage of the United Kingdom
Members of the Parliament of the United Kingdom for County Londonderry constituencies (1801–1922)
Lawyers from Belfast
Solicitors-General for Ireland
UK MPs 1880–1885
Members of the Privy Council of Ireland
Alumni of Queen's University Belfast
Masters of the Rolls in Ireland